Nicholas J. Wareham is a British epidemiologist who researches obesity, diabetes, and other metabolic disorders. He is director of the MRC Epidemiology Unit and co-director of the Institute of Metabolic Science at the University of Cambridge. He is also a Wellcome Trust Senior Fellow in Clinical Science at the University of Cambridge, the director of the University's Centre for Diet and Activity Research (CEDAR), and the co-leader of the University's Aetiology of Diabetes and Related Metabolic Disorders Programme. He was educated at St Thomas's Hospital Medical School and the London School of Hygiene and Tropical Medicine. Before joining the faculty at Cambridge, he worked at Harvard University.

References

External links

Living people
Fellows of Wolfson College, Cambridge
British epidemiologists
Obesity researchers
British diabetologists
Alumni of St Thomas's Hospital Medical School
Alumni of the London School of Hygiene & Tropical Medicine
Harvard School of Public Health faculty
NIHR Senior Investigators
Year of birth missing (living people)